Life in Slow Motion is the seventh studio album by English singer-songwriter David Gray, released on 12 September 2005 in Europe and Sept. 13 in the United States. Following a muted response to his previous album, A New Day at Midnight, the album was seen by some as a return to the form that brought Gray international acclaim with White Ladder; it was also the last album recorded with longtime collaborator Craig McClune.

Gray cited Sigur Rós, Sparklehorse, Lucinda Williams, Björk and Mercury Rev as inspirations for the album. The album was Gray's first to use a cello player. The original choice to produce was Daniel Lanois, but he was booked, so Gray ended up using Marius de Vries, who'd produced Gray's hit single "Sail Away."

The three singles from the album were "The One I Love", "Hospital Food", and "Alibi". The album was also released on DualDisc format, which included a documentary of the making of the album, a photo gallery, and complete lyrics on the DVD side of the disc.

The non-DualDisc CD of the album was one of many titles released with the infamous MediaMax CD-3 copyright protection system.

Chart and sales figures
Life in Slow Motion debuted at No. 1 on the Irish Albums Chart, staying for three weeks at the top before dropping to No. 4. In the United Kingdom a week after release in Ireland, it debuted also at No. 1 on the UK Albums Chart, spending two weeks at No. 1 before dropping to #3; it spent seven weeks in the top 10 and 25 weeks in the top 75. The album debuted and subsequently peaked at No. 16 on the U.S. Billboard 200 album chart.

Track listing

Credits

Musicians
 David Gray – vocals, piano, acoustic and electric guitar, harmonium, Wurlitzer, melodica
 Craig McClune – drums, percussion, dulcimer, glockenspiel, whistles, backing vocals
 Rob Malone – electric and double bass, acoustic and electric guitar, percussion
 Tim Bradshaw – piano, keyboards, electric and lap steel guitar, cello
 David Nolte – electric guitar, cello, melodica, autoharp, samples, backing vocals
 Marius de Vries – percussion, autoharp, recorder, glockenspiel, synthesizer, backing vocals
 Natalie Mendoza – backing vocals
 Caroline Dale – cello
 Strings on tracks 1, 2, and 7: contracted by Isobel Griffiths
 Gavyn Wright – orchestra leader
 Brass on tracks 1 and 5: performed by The Kick Horns
 Trumpet by Roddy Lorimer and Paul Spong
 Trombone by Neil Sidwell and Annie Whitehead
 Bass trombone by Dave Stewart
 French horn by Nigel Black, Dave Lee, and Michael Thompson
 Orchestral percussion by Frank Ricotta
 Track 5: baritone saxophone and assistant arrangement by Simon Clarke; French horn by Tim Jones

Production
 Produced by Marius de Vries with David Gray, Iestyn Polson, Craig McClune and Rob Malone
 Recorded and programmed by Iestyn Polson
 Mixed by Andy Bradfield
 Additional mix engineer/additional programming by Jason Boshoff
 Additional programming by Alexis Smith
 Track 1: orchestra arranged by Chris Elliott
 Track 2: orchestra arranged by David Nolte and Marius de Vries
 Track 5: horns arranged by Marius de Vries
 Track 7: strings arranged by Marius de Vries and Tim Bradshaw
 Mastered by Bob Ludwig
 Design and direction by Farrow Design
 Cover image concept by Red Design
 Cover photography by Joanna Thornhill
 Booklet photography by Phil Knott

Charts

Weekly charts

Year-end charts

Certifications and sales

References

David Gray (musician) albums
2005 albums
Atlantic Records albums
Albums produced by Iestyn Polson
Albums produced by Marius de Vries
ATO Records albums
Bertelsmann Music Group albums
IHT Records albums